San Chao Rong Thong is one of 15 tambons (sub-districts)  of Wiset Chai Chan District, Ang Thong Province, central Thailand, where most inhabitants are of Chinese descent.

History & presently
Its name meaning "gold station joss house" comes from having a Guan Yu joss house and many processed gold factories located. In the past, it was called "Ban Phai Cham Sin" (บ้านไผ่จำศีล) and changed to San Chao Rong Thong in the year 1877, after the officially establishment of Ang Thong Province by King Rama V and resulted in more immigrants settling to live.

San Chao Rong Thong is a community by the Noi River, it is an important trading district and main route to travel between Bangkok and the northern region since the past. Around 1950s–1960s traveling to Bangkok by locals, a water taxi was the only main vehicle, with up to three service piers. Noi River, as well as the local canals at that time, were also abundant with dangerous puffer fish including many other types of edible fish.

The market of San Chao Rong Thong has existed for 100 years and was almost designated by the Thai governments after a great fire on the middle of the night of December 6, 2005. It is divided into four parts are Talat Nuea (ตลาดเหนือ), Talat Khlang (ตลาดกลาง), Talat Tai (ตลาดใต้) and Talat Noi (ตลาดน้อย). At present, it still maintains the old community and the traditional way of life of local people as in the past include is another important cultural attraction of Ang Thong. What is famous for this market is many Thai sweets, which many kinds are rare dish. Also in the Talat Noi part, only every Saturday from 4.00 pm to 9.00 pm will be converted into a pedestrian street with a variety of products for sale.

Geography
The area of San Chao Rong Thong is a lowland without forests, mountains, An irrigation canal flows through every mubans (villages), providing water for agriculture. 

Neighboring tambons are (from the north clockwise): Muang Tia, Phai Cham Sin, Tha Chang and Yi Lon. 

Noi River is a main watercourse and Highway 3195 is a main road. 

San Chao Rong Thong is about 10 km (6 mi) from downtown Wiset Chai Chan.

Administration

Central administration
San Chao Rong Thong subdivided into 10 administrative villages

Local administration
San Chao Rong Thong is administered by the Subdistrict Administrative Organization (SAO) San Chao Rong Thong (องค์การบริหารส่วนตำบลศาลเจ้าโรงทอง).

Moreover, it is also divided into five communities.

Places
Wat Kien, an ancient temple with mural paintings is about 400 years old
Wat Nang Nai Thammikaram, a temple at one time, the magic monk, Luang Phor Num, used to be an abbot
San Chao Rong Thong Market, also known as Wiset Chai Chan Market

Local products
Thai sweets
Benjarong (five colours) ceramic products

Notable people
 Jermsak Pinthong, independent economist, political critic, TV host
Kengkat Jongjaiphra, actor, country singer, astrologer

References

Tambon of Ang Thong Province
Tourist attractions in Ang Thong province